Papua New Guinea competed at the 2015 World Aquatics Championships in Kazan, Russia from 24 July to 9 August 2015.

Swimming

Papua New Guinean swimmers have achieved qualifying standards in the following events (up to a maximum of 2 swimmers in each event at the A-standard entry time, and 1 at the B-standard):

Men

Women

Mixed

References

External links
Kazan 2015 Official Site

Nations at the 2015 World Aquatics Championships
2015 in Papua New Guinean sport
Papua New Guinea at the World Aquatics Championships